"Everybody Rise" is a song by Australian singer-songwriter Amy Shark. The song was released digitally on 18 June 2020 as the lead single from Shark's forthcoming second studio album, Cry Forever. An acoustic version was released on 7 August 2020.

At the ARIA Music Awards of 2020, the song garnered Shark nominations for Best Female Artist and Best Pop Release, winning the latter.

The song was nominated for Song of the Year and Most Performed Pop Work at the APRA Music Awards of 2021

The song won the Highest Selling Single at the 2021 Queensland Music Awards.

Music video
The music video for "Everybody Rise" was directed and produced by Patrick Tohill and premiered on 18 June 2020.

Track listing
 "Everybody Rise" – 3:10

 "Everybody Rise" (acoustic) – 3:46

Charts

Weekly charts

Year-end charts

Certifications

References
 

2020 singles
Amy Shark songs
Sony Music Australia singles
Songs written by Amy Shark
Song recordings produced by Joel Little
ARIA Award-winning songs
Songs written by Joel Little